Karshakevich is a surname. Notable people with the surname include:

 Aleksandr Karshakevich (born 1959), Belarusian footballer 
 Valery Karshakevich (born 1988), Belarusian footballer 

Belarusian-language surnames